The 2008 United States Senate election in Rhode Island took place on November 4, 2008. Incumbent Democratic U.S. Senator Jack Reed won re-election to a third term.

Democratic primary

Candidates 
 Jack Reed, incumbent U.S. Senator
 Chris Young, perennial candidate

Results

General election

Candidates 
 Jack Reed (D), incumbent U.S. Senator
 Robert Tingle (R), 2002 nominee, 2000 U.S. House nominee, and pit boss at Foxwoods Resort Casino

Predictions

Polling

Results

See also 
 2008 United States Senate elections

References

External links 
 Rhode Island Board of Elections
 U.S. Congress candidates for Rhode Island at Project Vote Smart
 Rhode Island, U.S. Senate from CQ Politics
 Rhode Island U.S. Senate from OurCampaigns.com
 Rhode Island U.S. Senate race from 2008 Race Tracker
 Campaign contributions from OpenSecrets
 Tingle (R) vs Reed (D-i) graph of multiple polls from Pollster.com
 Official campaign websites (Archived)
 Jack Reed for U.S. Senate Democratic candidate
 Bob Tingle for U.S. Senate Republican candidate

2008
Rhode Island
United States Senate